Miss le bomb is the pseudonym of artist and musician Catriona Shaw (born in Edinburgh, Scotland).  After finishing her studies at Edinburgh College of Art in 1997 she moved to Munich, Germany to continue her studies at the Munich Academy of Fine Arts and quickly became involved in the underground music circuit there. Teaming up with fellow students Emanuel Günther aka Dompteur Mooner of Zombie Nation and Benjamin Bergmann she formed Club le Bomb, an illegal Sunday club where happenings and concerts were staged and with which they toured around Europe in 2000 under the title "Club le Bomb: World Tour".  She also enjoyed some success as lead singer of the pop covers project Queen of Japan (with musicians Hans Platzgumer and Albert Poeschl).  After moving to Berlin in 2004 she started to produce music as Miss le Bomb, and regularly collaborates with Electronicat.

Discography as Miss le Bomb
 Pinkitan, (Girl Monster), Chicks on Speed Records, 2006
 Jealousy, Careless Records, 2006
 Lost Gigabyte, (with Electronicat), Pudel Produkte, 2006
 Vampire Moped Dead, (The Wired Ones), Wired Records, 2006
 Birds want to have cats, (Re:bird), Angelika Koehlermann, 2004
 Keiren, (with Electronicat), Echokammer, 2003

Discography as Catriona Shaw
 Keyboard Lies, (as E:Gum), Klein Records, 2002
 Miss Me, (with Hans Platzgumer), Doxa Records, 2002

See also
 Catriona

References

External links
Official site
Miss le Bomb on Discogs
Bavarian wiki site (German language)
Catriona Shaw on Discogs
Miss le Bomb interview on Phinnweb
Official Club le Bomb page
Queen of Japan

Year of birth missing (living people)
Living people
21st-century Scottish women singers
Academy of Fine Arts, Munich alumni
Alumni of the Edinburgh College of Art